Seven Letters may refer to:

Music
 Seven Letters (Ben E. King album), a 1965 album by Ben E. King
 Seven Letters (Tonus Peregrinus album), a 2005 album by Tonus Peregrinus of music by Antony Pitts

Other
 Letters to the seven churches in the Book of Revelation
 7 Letters, 2015 Singaporean anthology film